The Cosworth GBA is an extremely powerful turbocharged V6 racing engine, designed and developed by Cosworth, in partnership with Ford, for use in Formula One, from  to . The customer engine was raced by both Lola and Benetton. In the registration lists it appeared under the designations Ford TEC or Ford TEC-Turbo. The GBA was the only supercharged Formula 1 engine that Cosworth and Ford had in the so-called turbo era, and at the same time the last new development to be used before turbo engines were banned in 1989. The Cosworth GBA competed in 1986 and 1987. Only available to selected Formula 1 teams, it did not score a win in a Formula 1 World Championship round.

Nomenculture
Internally, the turbo engine bears the designation Cosworth GBA. The letter combination "GB" was intended to tie in with the Cosworth GA, Cosworth's first V6 engine from 1973, and to express that the new engine was the second Cosworth unit with this configuration. Apart from that, there was no relationship between the GA and the GB. The 3.4-liter GA was based on the Ford Essex block and was intended for use in touring car racing (Group 2).

To the public, the Cosworth GBA was marketed as the Ford TEC, TEC-Turbo, or TEC-F1; he also appeared in the entry lists for Formula 1 races. The letter combination TEC stood for Turbo Engine Cosworth.

Development history and background
The engine manufacturer Cosworth, founded in 1958 by Keith Duckworth and Mike Costin, was represented in the Formula 1 World Championship from 1967 with the 3.0 liter naturally aspirated DFV engine. The DFV, whose development Ford had financed, was freely accessible to all teams and dominated Formula 1 in the 1970s. With 155 world championship races won, 12 drivers' and 10 constructors' titles between 1967 and 1983, it is the most successful engine in the history of Formula 1. No other manufacturer was able to design a similarly competitive naturally aspirated engine. Only with the advent of turbo engines from 1977 did the DFV gradually fall behind. From 1981, the turbo engines were so powerful and reliable that they were able to win regularly and, a little later, also compete in the world championship. Therefore, in the early 1980s, the top and then also the midfield teams switched to turbo engines. From 1984 all drivers' world championships went to drivers with turbo engines.

Cosworth reacted to the emerging turbo wave with a wait-and-see attitude. Keith Duckworth considered the turbocharged engines in Formula 1 to be inconsistent with the regulations and did not deal with supercharged Formula 1 engines at all until 1982. A supercharged version of the DFV was created at Cosworth; however, this engine, called DFX, with a displacement of 2.65 liters was only intended for US racing series (CART). In Formula 1, on the other hand, the company stayed with the naturally aspirated engine concept for a long time. The DFV was further developed into the DFY, which won again in 1983 (Michele Alboreto for Tyrrell at the 1983 US Eastern Grand Prix). He could not prevent the loss of importance of the naturally aspirated engine concept. In 1985, only Minardi and Tyrrell started with DFV engines, which now produced at least 300 hp less than the turbocharged engines. 

The Ford group, which had financed the DFV and had benefited from the advertising effectiveness of its racing successes, had been pushing for the development of a turbo engine for Formula 1 since 1981. Because of Duckworth's hesitant attitude, Ford temporarily considered cooperation with the German company in this area Racing team Zakspeed, who had experience with turbocharged engines for more than ten years. When Duckworth finally agreed to develop a turbo engine in the summer of 1983, Ford decided to continue working with Cosworth. Development work on the Cosworth Turbo began in the fall of 1983, when Williams was already working with Honda - and McLaren with Porsche turbos were launched. The process was not linear. In the first phase, Cosworth designed an inline four-cylinder engine derived from the Cosworth BDA and based on an engine block from the Ford Escort. The four-cylinder concept was based on the BMW (M12) and Hart (415T) engines already in use. Over the course of the year, unsolvable problems with the load capacity of the crankshaft arose. So Duckworth gave up the four-cylinder project after about a year of development. In September 1984 the decision was made for a second concept, which meant a complete redesign. Cosworth opted for a six-cylinder V-engine, which received the designation GBA internally.

The development of the GBA was led by Geoff Goddard. The first drawings were made in December 1984, and the first prototype ran on the test bench on August 1, 1985. In February 1986 the first test drives took place at Boreham Proving Ground. Two months later the engine made its debut in a Formula 1 race.

The engine was only used in 1986 and 1987. A total of 25 blocks were built, which Cosworth took care of, unlike in the case of the DFV. In 1987, Cosworth employed about 100 people for the GBA alone. When the FIA imposed strict regulations for turbo engines for the 1988 season and, among other things, reduced the permissible boost pressure to 2.5 bar, Ford discontinued the GBA program: The new rules would have required extensive adjustments to the engine, which in view of the fact that turbo engines were completely banned from 1989 was considered uneconomical. Cosworth concentrated in the future again on naturally aspirated engines: For the preferred customer Benetton. The HB series was created, and the DFZ and DFR series for the smaller customer teams.

The Cosworth GBA was a compact V6 engine that was 450mm long and 510mm high. With regard to the number of cylinders, Cosworth was based on the successful TAG engine from Porsche. However, at 120 degrees, the cylinder bank angle was significantly larger than that of the Porsche (80 degrees), which was designed to be particularly narrow with a view to profiled underbodies. Because smooth underbodies were mandatory from 1983, Cosworth no longer had to take such aspects into account. The engine block and cylinder heads were made of aluminium alloy. The cylinder heads were different from the British Hart 415T detachable. The displacement was 1497 cm³. Cosworth did not disclose bore and stroke dimensions. Outside engineers estimate values ​​of 78 mm (bore) × 52.18 mm (stroke). The cylinder running surfaces were coated with Nikasil. Each cylinder had two intakes and two exhaust valves. The valves were at an angle of 40 degrees to each other. There were two overhead camshafts for each bank of cylinders, driven by chains for the first time since the Repco engines of the late 1960s. The GBA had twin turbochargers designed by Garrett, operating in a single stage. The ignition system was supplied by Magneti Marelli. The pistons came from Mahle. The engine electronics were a Ford development (EEC-IV).

The first engines had a compression ratio of 6.5:1. Over the course of the season, Cosworth gradually increased the compression ratio to 7.5:1 and eventually to 8.0:1. After starting at 700 hp for qualifying, the engines increased to around 1000 hp towards the end of the 1986 season. In the second half of the 1987 season, this achievement was finally achieved in the race. The performance of the Cosworth engines was thus slightly higher than that of the Honda engines.

Racing inserts
Unlike the DFV, the GBA was not a commonly available engine. The decision as to which teams were allowed to use the TEC turbo rested exclusively with Ford. For the years 1986 to 1988, Ford awarded the engine exclusively to Team Haas (USA), based in Colnbrook, UK. Cosworth was critical of the decision because Haas was a newly formed team that had only debuted in motorsport in 1985. In Ford's opinion, the prospect of financial support from the Beatrice group initially spoke in favor of Haas, which ultimately only came about to a very limited extent. In fact, Haas only used the engine in 1986. After that season, the team stopped racing.

At the end of the year, team founder Carl Haas sold his team's equipment to Bernie Ecclestone, the owner of the Brabham team, who wanted to use this detour to forward the GBA engines to Brabham for 1987 and 1988 access. However, Ford terminated the engine contract with Haas, so that ultimately neither Haas nor Ecclestone had access to the turbos. The Cosworth GBA instead went to the Benetton team in 1987, who used it in two cars that season. In 1988 the TEC-F1 was no longer used.

Team Haas
The TEC made its debut in the 1986 San Marino Grand Prix with Team Haas (USA), alternatively referred to in the media as Haas-Lola, Beatrice, Beatrice-Lola, or FORCE-Lola. Haas has been active in Formula 1 since 1985. The team had contested its first season with British turbo engines from Hart. Haas also started the second season with Hart engines. Drivers were Alan Jones and Patrick Tambay. At the third race of the season in Imola, the Cosworth GBA was ready for use, but initially, the team only had one engine available. The previous THL1 chassis was converted to the THL2 for him. The new car with the new engine went to Alan Jones, while Tambay still started with the THL1-Hart at Imola. Here the new THL2 with Ford engine was clearly inferior to the old THL1. In qualifying, Jones was almost three seconds slower than Tambay. In the race, Jones retired after 28 laps with an overheated engine. From Monaco, both Haas cars started with the Cosworth turbo. During the 1986 season, the THL2 suffered from a lack of reliability. Jones retired ten times out of 14 races with the car, Tambay just as often out of 13 races. However, there were also three finishes in the points: Jones finished fourth at the Austrian Grand Prix, and in the subsequent race in Italy he finished sixth. Tambay took fifth place in Austria. In the warm-up for the Canadian Grand Prix, Tambay crashed after a driving error. He sustained injuries to his feet that prevented him from racing in Montréal and a week later in Detroit. In the US, Eddie Cheever took over instead the second car from Haas. Overall, Haas scored six championship points in 1986 and finished eighth in the constructors' championship. Already in the early summer of 1986, the end of the racing team became apparent. The reason for this was on the one hand the sporting results, which fell short of the - unrealistically high - expectations, on the other hand, the team's economic difficulties. The 1987 season would have required a new sponsor, which Haas could not find. In October 1986, Haas shut down the racing team.

Benetton
The British racing team Benetton Formula emerged from the Toleman team in 1986. While Toleman had used Hart engines for six years, in his first season Benetton started and scored a win with customer engines from BMW, which Mader serviced. For the 1987 season, Benetton received the Cosworth GBA engines exclusively. The emergency vehicle was the Rory Byrne-designed Benetton B187, a development of last year's BMW-powered B186. Drivers throughout the season were Teo Fabi and Thierry Boutsen. In Cosworth's opinion, Benetton was structurally better positioned than Haas, so efficient further development of the turbo engine was possible.

Boutsen and Fabi almost always qualified for the first five rows with the Cosworth GBA. The best qualifying result was Boutsen's third starting position in the penultimate race in Japan, plus several fourth starting positions. Boutsen finished nine times and Fabi seven times. After numerous technical failures at the beginning of the season, most of the drivers reached the finish line in the second half of the year. Boutsen finished nine, Fabi seven races with finishes. The Benetton-Fords scored regularly. Both drivers finished third once (Fabi in Austria, Boutsen after the disqualification of Ayrton Senna in Japan). There were also three fourth and five fifth places. At the end of the year, Benetton was fifth in the constructors' championship with 28 points.

Applications
Lola THL2
Benetton B187

Gallery

References

Formula One engines
V6 engines
Ford engines
Cosworth